Events from the year 2012 in Moldova

Incumbents
President: Marian Lupu (Acting President) (until March 23), Nicolae Timofti (starting March 23)
Prime Minister: Vlad Filat

Events 

 January 1 - Moldova security zone incident
 January 15 - second attempt at Moldovan presidential election

Deaths

January 
 January 2 - Ivan Călin, 76, politician, Acting President of the Moldovan Parliament (2009)

References

 
2010s in Moldova
Moldova
Moldova
Years of the 21st century in Moldova